AT&T Laboratories, Inc. was the research & development division of AT&T Corporation. It was founded in 1925 as Bell Telephone Laboratories, Inc., following the merger of the research & development divisions of American Telephone & Telegraph and Western Electric.

History

In 1996, most of Bell Labs was spun off into Lucent Technologies, along with AT&T Technologies, formerly Western Electric, and the Bell Labs name. Research dealing with telephone equipment and most physical research went to Lucent.

But a smaller number of researchers dealing with voice technology, network management, and software stayed with AT&T Bell Laboratories, Inc., which was renamed AT&T Laboratories, Inc.  Locations included Shannon Labs in Florham Park, New Jersey, and Middletown, New Jersey.

In 2005, SBC Communications purchased AT&T Corporation, and changed its own corporate name to AT&T Inc. The operations of AT&T Laboratories were then absorbed into SBC's R&D division, SBC Laboratories, which then was renamed AT&T Labs, Inc.

External links
AT&T Labs website under old AT&T

AT&T subsidiaries
Bell System
American companies disestablished in 2005
1928 establishments in New Jersey
American companies established in 1925
Technology companies established in 1925
Electronics companies established in 1925